Eugene Belliveau (born May 30, 1958) is a former Canadian football defensive lineman.

Belliveau was born in Clarke City, Quebec. He played college football at St. Francis Xavier University and played ten seasons in the Canadian Football League for the Montreal Alouettes and the Calgary Stampeders.

1958 births
Living people
Players of Canadian football from Quebec
Canadian football defensive linemen
Canadian people of Acadian descent
Calgary Stampeders players
French Quebecers
Montreal Alouettes players
Montreal Concordes players
People from Sept-Îles, Quebec
St. Francis Xavier University alumni
St. Francis Xavier X-Men football players